The Kurri Kurri Bulldogs is a semi-professional Australian rugby league football club based in Kurri Kurri, New South Wales formed in 1911. They currently play in the Newcastle Rugby League competition.

Home Ground
The Bulldogs home ground is Kurri Kurri sports ground. It is also known as "the graveyard", due to the area once being a graveyard and also many visiting post-punk and gothic teams that have visited the ground over the years.

Grades
Kurri Kurri Bulldogs currently have 5 senior teams playing in the Newcastle Rugby League and Newcastle & Hunter Rugby League.
First Grade, Reserve Grade & U19's (Newcastle Rugby League).
Open Grade & Women's Tackle ( Newcastle & Hunter Rugby League).

Colours
Red, white and blue.

Primary jerseys

Notable Juniors
Eddie Lumsden (1955-66 Manly-Warringah Sea Eagles, St George Dragons)
John Sattler (1963-72 South Sydney Rabbitohs)
Mark Hughes (1997-05 Newcastle Knights)
Sam Anderson (2013-15 Penrith Panthers)

See also
 Newcastle Rugby League
 Newcastle & Hunter Rugby League

References 

Rugby clubs established in 1911
1911 establishments in Australia
Rugby league teams in Newcastle, New South Wales